Radepont is a commune in the Eure department in Normandy, northern France.

It is located 22 km south west of Rouen, on the river Andelle.

History
Radepont's monuments include the chateau de Radepont and the ruined Cistercian abbey of Notre-Dame de Fontaine-Guerard

The abbey was founded in 1185 by Robert III de Beaumont. 
In the 12th century Radepont passed from the ownership of the Abbey of Les Préaux to Robert du Plessis. In 1194, Richard the Lion Heart had a castle built on this land.

Population

See also
Communes of the Eure department

References

Communes of Eure